Təzəkənd (also, Tazakend) is a village in the Lankaran Rayon of Azerbaijan.

References 

Populated places in Lankaran District